Machaeranthera tanacetifolia is a species of flowering plant in the family Asteraceae known by the common names tansyleaf tansyaster and Tahoka daisy.

Description 
Between May and September, an inflorescence bears one or more flower heads lined with spreading or curling, pointed phyllaries. The fruit is a flat achene about 1 cm long including the pappus.

It is similar to M. parviflora, the flower heads of which are smaller.

Distribution and habitat
It is native to Alberta, the southwestern and central United States, and northern Mexico. It grows in several types of habitat, including sandy open plains and deserts.

Uses
The Zuni people use an infusion of the flowers taken with other flowers for unspecified illnesses.

References

External links
Jepson Manual Treatment
USDA Plants Profile
Kansas Wildflowers
Photo gallery

Flora of Mexico
Flora of the Southwestern United States
Plants used in traditional Native American medicine
Astereae